Adrian Henry Wardle Robinson (12 June 1925 – 22 November 2018) was a British geographer noted for his work on shallow water oceanography and on the history of marine surveying.

Robinson became a fellow of the Royal Geographical Society in 1945. He then worked as a cartographer in the Hydrographic Office of the Admiralty. In 1946 he prepared a paper describing the changes in the channels and sandbanks of the Thames Estuary, work which foreshadowed his interests in shallow water oceanography and the history of hydrography.

Robinson obtained an MSc at London University in 1952. He worked at the University of Leicester, as lecturer in Geography. from 1952. He received his PhD, also from London, in 1960, and became reader at Leicester in 1969. He carried out considerable research into the factors affecting coasts and shallow waters, particularly in sandy bays and estuaries, and in harbour entrances. He was also occupied with the history of marine surveying and cartography of Britain, publishing several journal articles as well as his highly regarded book Marine Cartography in Britain, with many maps and diagrams by his wife, Gwyneth, herself a former cartographer. During the 1970s, Robinson collaborated with Roy Millward, also of the University of Leicester, in a series of books on the Landscapes of Britain, as well as on the The Shell Book of the British Coast (1983), again with maps prepared by Gwyneth Robinson . He was an industrial consultant on coastal and seabed issues.

References

Selected bibliography
 
 
 
 
 
 
 
 
 
 
 
 
 
 
 
 
 
 
 Millward, Roy; Robinson, Adrian. Landscapes of Britain series: The Lake District (1970); South East England - Thameside and the Weald (1971); The West Midlands (1971); The South - West Peninsula (1971); The Welsh Marches (1971); Cumbria (1972) South East England - the channel coastlands (1973); The Low Weald and Downs (1973); The Peak District (1975); The Welsh Borders (1978); Landscapes of North Wales (1978); Upland Britain (1980).
 

1925 births
2018 deaths
Alumni of the University of London
Academics of the University of Leicester
British geographers
Fellows of the Royal Geographical Society